Defying Gravity is the ninth studio album from American hard rock band Mr. Big. It is their first album to feature drumming contributions from Matt Starr, who has been filling in since 2014, as founding member Pat Torpey was unable to perform drums on most songs due to his Parkinson's disease diagnosis, but performs on some tracks and is credited as "drum producer". Defying Gravity was Torpey's final studio appearance prior to his death on February 7, 2018.

Track listing

Personnel
Mr. Big
 Eric Martin – lead vocals
 Paul Gilbert – guitar, backing vocals
 Billy Sheehan – bass guitar, backing vocals
 Pat Torpey – drum producer, backing vocals

Additional musicians
 Matt Starr – drums, percussion

Production
 Kevin Elson – producer, engineer, mixing
 Greg Foeller – assistant engineer
 Kevin Cofield – additional recording engineer
 Chris Manning – lead vocals producer and engineer
 Giovanni Murrillo, Ari Blitz – mixing assistants
 Dave Collins – mastering
 Larry Freemantle – art direction
 William Hames, Jason Quigley, Larry Dimarzio – photography

References

2017 albums
Mr. Big (American band) albums
Frontiers Records albums
Albums produced by Kevin Elson